Clearfield County is a county in the Commonwealth of Pennsylvania. As of the 2020 census, the population was 80,562. The county seat is Clearfield, and the largest city is DuBois. The county was created in 1804 and later organized in 1822.

Clearfield County comprises the DuBois, PA Micropolitan Statistical Area, which is also included in the State College–DuBois, PA Combined Statistical Area.

History

Clearfield County was formed by the Act of Assembly by the second Governor of Pennsylvania at the time, Thomas McKean on March 26, 1804.  The county was created from parts of the already created counties of Huntingdon and Lycoming.  The name for the county was most likely derived from the many cleared fields of the valleys surrounding Clearfield Creek and West Branch of the Susquehanna River, formed by the bison herds and also by old corn fields of prior Native Americans tribes.

Location of county government
The first board of county commissioners to the county were Roland Curtin, James Fleming and James Smith, all appointed by Governor McKean in 1805.  The first act the commissioners did was to create a local government or seat of the newly created county.  They came upon land owned at the time by Abraham Witmer at a village known as Chincleclamousche, named after the Native American chief of the Cornplanter's tribe of Senecas.  Clearfield became the new name of the old village.

Early industry
The two major industries of the county in the mid-1800s until the early 1900s was lumber and coal.  Lumber was still being floated down the West Branch of the Susquehanna up until 1917.  Coal remains the main industry of the county to this day.

Clearfield County Conspiracy Trials
No case tried in the county has caused as much comment as the union conspiracy trials. In all there were fifty-six persons, primarily miners in the Houtzdale region, who were charged with conspiracy as organized strikers.

The first case, against John Maloney and fifty-three others, was tried in 1875, before a jury with Judge Orvis presiding. All were found guilty, although they seem to have been solely peacefully picketing. Four were sentenced to one year's imprisonment and eight, to six months; the others' sentences were suspended. As every organized labor society in the United States was interested in the result, the events of the trial and verdict were telegraphed throughout the country

This proceeding was followed by the trial of the remaining two offenders, who were union representatives, John Siney and Xingo Parks. Siney was then the President of the Miners’ National Association (MNA); he had come to Houtzdale and delivered an address of support for the union strike, for which he was arrested. Parks was an able organizer for the MNA. Federal Senator Matthew H. Carpenter of Wisconsin defended both men. At trial, Siney was acquitted; Parks was found guilty of inciting unlawful assembly and sentenced to one year's imprisonment, but pardoned within a month from the time sentence was pronounced. 

These cases led in the next year to a liberalization of the Pennsylvania conspiracy law, through amendment providing that only "force, threat, or menace of harm to person or property" would be illegal.

Geography
It is the third-largest county in Pennsylvania by land area and fourth-largest by total area. The West Branch Susquehanna River flows through the county, bisecting the county seat along the way.

The mountainous terrain of the county made traffic difficult for early settlers. Various Native American paths and trails crossing the area were used intermittently by settlers, invading armies, and escaped slaves travelling north along the Underground Railroad. A major feature located in Bloom Township, within the county, is known as Bilger's rocks and exhibits fine examples of exposed sandstone bedrock that was created during the formation of the Appalachian Mountains.

The shape of Clearfield County bears an amazing resemblance to that of the state of Arkansas.

Major highways

, exits 97, 101, 111, 120, 123 & 133

Adjacent counties

 Elk County (north)
 Cameron County (north)
 Clinton County (northeast)
 Centre County (east)
 Blair County (southeast)
 Cambria County (south)
 Indiana County (southwest)
 Jefferson County (west)

Climate
The county has a warm-summer humid continental climate (Dfb). Average monthly temperatures in DuBois range from 24.6 °F in January to 68.6 °F in July, while in Clearfield borough they range from 23.8 °F in January to 69.3 °F in July and in Osceola Mills they range from 24.4 °F in January to 69.1 °F in July.

Demographics

As of the census of 2000, there were 83,382 people, 32,785 households, and 22,916 families residing in the county. The population density was 73 people per square mile (28/km2). There were 37,855 housing units at an average density of 33 per square mile (13/km2). The racial makeup of the county was 97.40% White, 1.49% Black or African American, 0.12% Native American, 0.26% Asian, 0.01% Pacific Islander, 0.26% from other races, and 0.46% from two or more races. 0.56% of the population were Hispanic or Latino of any race. 22.9% were of German, 13.6% American, 10.2% English, 9.9% Irish, 9.1% Italian and 6.0% Polish ancestry.

There were 32,785 households, out of which 29.70% had children under the age of 18 living with them, 56.60% were married couples living together, 9.30% had a female householder with no husband present, and 30.10% were non-families. 26.30% of all households were made up of individuals, and 13.10% had someone living alone who was 65 years of age or older. The average household size was 2.44 and the average family size was 2.94.

In the county, the population was spread out, with 22.70% under the age of 18, 7.70% from 18 to 24, 28.80% from 25 to 44, 23.90% from 45 to 64, and 16.90% who were 65 years of age or older. The median age was 39 years. For every 100 females there were 99.50 males. For every 100 females age 18 and over, there were 97.50 males.

2020 Census

Micropolitan Statistical Area

The United States Office of Management and Budget has designated Clearfield County as the DuBois, PA Micropolitan Statistical Area (µSA).  As of the 2010 census the micropolitan area ranked sixth most populous in the State of Pennsylvania and the 65th most populous in the United States, with a population of 81,642. Clearfield County is also a part of the State College–DuBois, PA Combined Statistical Area (CSA), which combines the populations of both Clearfield and Centre County areas, along with the State College area. The combined statistical area ranked the ninth most populous in Pennsylvania and 125th most populous in the U.S. with a population of 235,632.

Politics and government

Voter registration
As of February 21, 2022, there are 48,052 registered voters in Clearfield County.

 Democratic: 14,216 (29.58%)
 Republican: 28,344 (58.99%)
 Independent: 3,397 (7.07%)
 Third Party: 2,095 (4.36%)

While the county registration tends to be evenly matched between Democrats and Republicans, the county trends Republican in statewide and federal elections. The last Democrat to win a majority in the county was Lyndon B. Johnson in 1964, while Jimmy Carter and Bill Clinton winning pluralities in the county, with the former by 88 votes. In 2006, Democrat Bob Casey Jr. received 55% of its vote when he unseated incumbent Republican US Senator Rick Santorum and Ed Rendell received 50.2% of the vote against Lynn Swann. Each of the three row-office statewide winners carried Clearfield in 2008.

|}

County commissioners

Other county offices

State House of Representatives

United States House of Representatives

United States Senate

Correctional facilities
Clearfield County Jail
Moshannon Valley Correctional Center
Quehanna Bootcamp
SCI Houtzdale

Education

Colleges and universities
Lock Haven University of Pennsylvania at Clearfield, Pennsylvania
Pennsylvania State University at DuBois

Community, junior and technical colleges
Clearfield County Career and Technology Center
Triangle Tech

Public school districts
 Clearfield Area School District
 Curwensville Area School District
 DuBois Area School District (also in Jefferson County)
 Glendale School District (also in Cambria County)
 Harmony Area School District (also in Indiana County)
 Moshannon Valley School District
 Philipsburg-Osceola Area School District (also in Centre County)
 Purchase Line School District (also in Indiana County)
 West Branch Area School District (also in Clinton County)

Intermediate unit
 Central IU 10 – West Decatur

Correctional institution schools
 Quehanna Boot Camp – Karthaus
 SCI-Houtzdale – Houtzdale
 Clearfield County Jail-Clearfield

Private schools
 Butchers Run Amish School 
 Clearfield Alliance Christian School
 DuBois Area Catholic Elementary School
 DuBois Area Catholic High School
 DuBois Christian Schools
 Golden Yoke School
 Milestones Achievement Center
 Mount Calvary Christian Academy
 New Story (DuBois)
 Otterbein Christian Academy
 Paint & Play School (DuBois)
 Scenic View School
 St Francis Grade School
 Weber Road School

Libraries
 Clearfield County Public Library – Curwensville
 Curwensville Public Library
 DuBois Public Library – 
 Glendale Public Library – Coalport
 Joseph and Elizabeth Shaw Public Library – Clearfield

Recreation
There are two Pennsylvania state parks in Clearfield County.
Parker Dam State Park
S. B. Elliott State Park

Clearfield County is also home to the largest wild area in Pennsylvania, the Quehanna Wild Area. A culturally and historically significant natural formation of massive sandstone megaliths can be found at Bilger's rocks.

Camping
Lodging/Camping

Hunting/fishing
Hunting

Fishing

Sporting
Golf

Points of interest
 Bilger's Rocks
 Clearfield Armory
 Dimeling Hotel
 McGees Mills Covered Bridge
 St. Severin's Old Log Church

Communities

Under Pennsylvania law, there are four types of incorporated municipalities: cities, boroughs, townships, and, in at most two cases, towns. The following cities, boroughs and townships are located in Clearfield County:

City
DuBois

Boroughs

Brisbin
Burnside
Chester Hill
Clearfield (county seat)
Coalport
Curwensville
Falls Creek (mostly in Jefferson County)
Glen Hope
Grampian
Houtzdale
Irvona
Mahaffey
New Washington
Newburg (also known as La Jose)
Osceola Mills
Ramey
Troutville
Wallaceton
Westover

Townships

Beccaria
Bell
Bigler
Bloom
Boggs
Bradford
Brady
Burnside
Chest
Cooper
Covington
Decatur
Ferguson
Girard
Goshen
Graham
Greenwood
Gulich
Huston
Jordan
Karthaus
Knox
Lawrence
Morris
Penn
Pike
Pine
Sandy
Union
Woodward

Census-designated places
Census-designated places are geographical areas designated by the U.S. Census Bureau for the purposes of compiling demographic data. They are not actual jurisdictions under Pennsylvania law. Other unincorporated communities, such as villages, may be listed here as well.

Allport
Bigler
Grassflat
Hawk Run
Hyde
Kylertown
Morrisdale
Oklahoma
Plymptonville
Sandy
Treasure Lake
West Decatur

Unincorporated communities
Unincorporated areas are region of land that are not parts of any incorporated boroughs, cities, or towns.

Helvetia
Lumber City
New Castle (Clearfield County) – in Decatur Township
Sylvan Grove
Viola

Population ranking
The population ranking of the following table is based on the 2010 census of Clearfield County.

† county seat

Notable people
Mary Elizabeth Willson (1842–1906), gospel singer, singer, composer, evangelist
Willie Adams, major league baseball pitcher (1912–1919)
Howie Bedell, major league baseball player
William Bigler (January 1, 1814 – August 9, 1880), American politician, 12th Governor of Pennsylvania from 1852 to 1855, later U.S. Senator for Pennsylvania from 1856 until 1861.
 Earl Caldwell, former reporter and columnist for The New York Times; first African-American to have a regular column in a major national newspaper. Central figure in a major Supreme Court case about the protection of journalists' sources. Currently hosts Pacifica's WBAI radio (New York City)
Otto Eppers, cartoonist/illustrator who as part of a stunt successfully jumped off the Brooklyn Bridge at 17 years of age
Howard Fargo, former member of the Pennsylvania House of Representatives (1981–2000)
Anthony A. Mitchell, clarinetist, composer and conductor. Led the United States Navy Band from 1962 to 1968.
Rembrandt Cecil Robinson (1924–1972) was a United States Navy officer (Rear admiral)[17]
Edward Scofield, governor of Wisconsin (1897–1901)
William Irvin Swoope, Republican member of the U.S. House of Representatives (1923–27)
William A. Wallace, Democratic U.S. senator who served from 1875 to 1881
Powell Weaver, composer and organist
Zenas Leonard (1809 - 1857), American mountain man, explorer and trader, known for his journal "Narrative of the Adventures of Zenas Leonard"

See also
 Interstate 80 in Pennsylvania#Highest Point on 80
 Indian old field
 National Register of Historic Places listings in Clearfield County, Pennsylvania

References

External links

History of Townships in Clearfield County, PA
 History of Clearfield County
 Clearfield County Fair

 
1822 establishments in Pennsylvania
Populated places established in 1822
Counties of Appalachia
Ukrainian communities in the United States